The Tonga Room & Hurricane Bar is a restaurant and tiki bar in the Fairmont San Francisco hotel in San Francisco, California. Named after the South Pacific nation of Tonga, this dining and entertainment venue opened in 1945.
The Tonga Room replaced the Terrace Plunge, an indoor swimming pool that was installed in the Fairmont in 1929. The pool was transformed into the Tonga Room's lagoon. The restaurant was redesigned again in 1967.

A report by the City of San Francisco Planning Department called the Tonga Room a "historical resource." Citing the Polynesian-themed bar's artificial lagoon, rainstorms, and lava rock, the report said: "The Tonga Room exhibits exceptional importance due to its rarity and as one of the best examples of 'high-style' Tiki bar/restaurant in San Francisco."

References

External links
 The Tonga Room & Hurricane Bar official website

Drinking establishments in the San Francisco Bay Area
Landmarks in San Francisco
Nob Hill, San Francisco
Restaurants in San Francisco
Restaurants established in 1945
1945 establishments in California
Tiki culture
Tiki bars